Mary Immaculate Cathedral Also Cathedral of the Immaculate Conception It is the name that receives a religious building affiliated with the Catholic church that is located in the town of Nelson in the north of the province of British Columbia in western Canada.

The church is the mother church of the Roman Catholic Diocese of Nelson which was created in 1843 as an apostolic vicariate and was elevated to an diocese in 1936 by the bull "Universorum christifidelium" of Pope Pius XI.

The current building dates back to 1889 when it began as a parish, being built as a cathedral between 1936, year in which it obtained the current status. With its six two storey columns across the front and other features it is an example of Roman Classic architecture.

Its current administrator is the bishop Gregory John Matthew Bittman .

See also 
 List of cathedrals in Canada
Holy Rosary Cathedral (Vancouver)

References

Roman Catholic churches in British Columbia
Roman Catholic cathedrals in British Columbia
Nelson, British Columbia